Hilarographa plurimana is a species of moth of the family Tortricidae. It is found in Brazil and Peru.

References

Moths described in 1863
Hilarographini